The Regrettes is an American punk rock band from Los Angeles. The band is led by frontwoman Lydia Night. They released three studio albums on Warner Bros. Records: Feel Your Feelings Fool! (2017), How Do You Love? (2019), and Further Joy (2022).

History

2015: Early career and Hey! EP

Prior to the formation of the band, lead vocalist Lydia Night met guitarist Genessa Gariano, bassist Sage Chavis, and drummer Maxx Morando in music school. At the time, Gariano, Chavis and Morando were in a band together, called "Genessa" and Night was in the two-piece band Pretty Little Demons (who changed their name to The Regrettes in the last few months of life) with drummer Marlhy Murphy. Both of the bands played a concert together, but soon after Murphy departed from the band after the release of their EP "Hey!" on October 16, 2015, leading to Night asking Gariano, Chavis, and Morando to join. The "Hey!" EP was eventually discovered by a representative at Warner Brothers, which would eventually led to them signing the band. In 2016, the band toured with both Tacocat and Sleigh Bells, opened for Kate Nash, and performed at South by Southwest.

2015–2017: Feel Your Feelings Fool!

In 2015, the band's independent release led to a record deal with Warner Bros. Records. Their first album was produced by Mike Elizondo and their first single, "A Living Human Girl", was released in June 2016.
Other singles followed including "Hey Now", "Hot", and "Seashore." On January 13, 2017, the band released its debut studio album, Feel Your Feelings Fool!. In May 2017, the band announced a summer headlining tour which includes stops at Summerfest and Riot Fest. On February 9, 2018, the band released the single "Come Through," from their EP Attention Seeker, released on February 23, 2018. It was accompanied by a music video. On May 9, 2018, the band announced Morando's departure. On May 22, 2018, the tour bus containing all their belongings was stolen from outside the Sunflower Lounge, Birmingham, UK where they later played a sold-out gig.
 On May 31, 2018, the band contributed the sixth Hamildrop, a cover of the song "Helpless". Lin-Manuel Miranda credited producer Mike Elizondo as having suggested the idea. On September 3, 2018, the band announced Sage Chavis' departure, being replaced by Violet Mayugba.

2018–2021: How Do You Love?
On November 28, 2018, the band announced the departure of Mayugba and recruitment of Brooke Dickson as their new bass player. From February 6 to March 17, 2019, The Regrettes were the opening act of Twenty One Pilots' European leg of The Bandito Tour. 

On June 18, 2019, The Regrettes announced their second studio album, How Do You Love?. The album was released on August 9, 2019.

2021–present: Further Joy
The Regrettes released their third studio album, Further Joy, on April 8, 2022.

Musical style
The Regrettes' musical style has been labeled as punk rock, riot grrrl, garage pop, and garage punk, featuring elements of garage rock, '60s doo-wop and surf music, rockabilly, and pop music. Michael Bialas, a writer at PopMatters described their sound as "girl-group power-pop punk" In an article by Culture Collide, their style was described as "Channeling classic doo-wop through a catchy garage-punk filter" and as bringing "a level of impassioned aggression to tried-and-true pop structures, creating a compelling product with significant crossover appeal."

Lyrically, their music has been described as following themes such as women's empowerment, feminism, politics, and love. In an article by The Verge, their lyrics were described as "brash and unapologetic".

They also cite musical influences including Bikini Kill, L7, 7 Year Bitch, Elvis Presley, Buddy Holly, The Ronettes, Hole, The Crystals, Lesley Gore and Patsy Cline.

Band members
Current lineup
Lydia Night – lead vocals, rhythm guitar, keyboards (2015–present), lead guitar, bass (2015)
Genessa Gariano – lead guitar, keyboards, backing vocals (2015–present)
Brooke Dickson – bass, keyboards, backing vocals (2018–present)
Drew Thomsen – drums, backing vocals (2018–present)

Past members
Maxx Morando – drums (2015–2018)
Marlhy Murphy – drums, backing vocals (2015)
Sage Chavis – bass, backing vocals (2015–2018)
Violet Mayugba – bass, backing vocals (2018)

Timeline

Discography

Studio albums
Feel Your Feelings Fool! (2017)
How Do You Love? (2019)
Further Joy (2022)

EPs
Hey! (2015)
 Attention Seeker (2018)

Singles
"Hey Now" (2015)
"A Living Human Girl" (2016)
"Hey Now" (2016)
"Hot" (2016)
"Seashore" (2016)
"Marshmallow World" (Bing Crosby cover) (2016)
"Back in Your Head" (Tegan and Sara cover) (2017)
"Come Through" (2018)
"Helpless" (Hamilton cover) (2018)
"California Friends" (2018)
"Poor Boy" (2018)
"Don't Stop Me Now" (Queen cover) (2018)
"Pumpkin" (2019)
"Dress Up" (2019)
"I Dare You" (2019)
"Holiday-ish" (ft. Dylan Minnette) (2019)
"What Am I Gonna Do Today" (2020)
"I Love Us" (2020)
"Monday" (2021)
"You're So F*cking Pretty" (2021)
 "That's What Makes Me Love You" (2022)
 "Anxieties (Out Of Time)" (2022)
 "Barely On My Mind" (2022)

References

External links
Official website

Musical groups established in 2015
Musical groups from Los Angeles
2015 establishments in California
American punk rock groups
Riot grrrl bands